West Central Ohio CW was the name of a cable-only television station in the Lima, Ohio, media market. It was owned and operated by Time Warner Cable.

History

The station was created on September 21, 1998 as an affiliate of The WB (via The WB 100+), using the fake calls WBOH, but switched to The CW when The WB shut down on September 18, 2006. That same day, local NBC affiliate WLIO was still in negotiations with local Time Warner Cable to carry WBOH's CW digital signal on its basic cable lineup on channel 3, The WB's former channel number. On November 20, WLIO finally reached an agreement with Time Warner Cable and began to carry The CW on basic cable channel 3, as well as on WLIO's digital subchannel, channel 35.2 / 8.2.

WLIO's affiliation with The CW ended on September 17, 2008, and was not renewed. Had it been, Lima, Ohio, would have become the first market where the affiliates of all six major networks would have been controlled by a single company. Shortly thereafter, West Central Ohio CW was reinstated on cable only, carrying programming supplied by the CW Plus Network. In 2010, Time Warner Cable replaced The CW Plus with Dayton's CW affiliate WBDT in its Lima channel lineup.

References

Defunct local cable stations in the United States
2010 disestablishments in Ohio
Television channels and stations disestablished in 2010
Defunct mass media in Ohio
The CW affiliates